Martín Alonso Ramírez Ramírez (born November 8, 1960 in Bogotá) is a Colombian former road bicycle racer. He won the Critérium du Dauphiné Libéré in 1984. His mother was a homemaker while his father was a construction worker. Feeling the intense need and desire to earn an income, at age 16 he decided to work as a delivery man for a well known drug store in Bogota, called the Ultramar. It was here that he picked up a passion for cycling.

Major results
1982
 1st Stage 6 Vuelta a Colombia
 1st Stage 1 Coors Classic
1984
 1st  Overall Critérium du Dauphiné Libéré
 4th Overall Clásico RCN
1st Prologue
1985
 1st  Overall Tour de l'Avenir
1st Stage 8
1987
 9th Overall Setmana Catalana de Ciclisme
1990
 1st Stage 5 Clásico RCN

Grand Tour general classification results timeline

External links

(fr) Martín Ramírez teams

1960 births
Colombian male cyclists
Living people
Sportspeople from Bogotá